Richard Charles DeBolt (born November 3, 1965) is an American politician of the Republican Party. He was a member of the Washington House of Representatives, representing the 20th district from 1997 to 2021. He was House Republican Leader from 2004 to 2005 and again from 2006 to 2013.

Awards 
 2014 Guardians of Small Business award. Presented by NFIB.
 2020 Guardians of Small Business. Presented by NFIB.

References

External links 
 Richard DeBolt at ballotpedia.org
 Richard DeBolt at ourcampaigns.com

1965 births
Living people
Republican Party members of the Washington House of Representatives
21st-century American politicians